The Pelotas Microregion (Portuguese: Microrregião de Pelotas) is a microregion in the southeastern part of the state of Rio Grande do Sul, Brazil.  The area is 10,306.601 km².

Municipalities 
The microregion consists of the following municipalities:
Arroio do Padre
Canguçu
Capão do Leão
Cerrito
Cristal
Morro Redondo
Pedro Osório
Pelotas
São Lourenço do Sul
Turuçu

References

Microregions of Rio Grande do Sul